The National Institute of Development Administration (NIDA) ) is a public graduate university in Thailand under the Commission on Higher Education, the Ministry of Education.

NIDA has 10 graduate schools aimed to serve economics and social development. One of the founding schools, NIDA Business School, was the first graduate school in Thailand to offer an MBA program. NIDA Business School received accreditation from the Association to Advance Collegiate Schools of Business (AACSB).

History of the institute
NIDA was founded on 1 April 1966 with initial assistance from the Department of Technical and Economic Cooperation, the Ford Foundation, and the Midwest Universities Consortium for International Activities (MUCIA).

At the beginning, NIDA was an autonomous institute affiliated with Thammasat University which ran its own activities and managed its own budget. Later, a merger of the School of Public Administration of Thammasat University and resources from the National Economic and Social Development Board and  National Statistical Office combined to become a full-fledged university concentrating exclusively on graduate studies in fields related to national development.

NIDA, in conjunction with Chulalongkorn University and Thammasat University, offer a joint doctoral program in business administration (JDBA) with funding from the Canadian International Development Agency (CIDA) through the Association of Deans of South East Asian Graduate Schools of Management (ADSGM).

Notable alumni
Somchai Wongsawat, 26th Prime Minister of Thailand.
Somkid Jatusripitak, Deputy Prime Minister and Minister of Commerce of Thailand.
Yongyuth Wichaidit, Deputy Prime Minister, Minister of Interior of Thailand, and Leader of Pheu Thai Party.
Anupong Paochinda, Minister of Interior in General Prayut Chan-o-cha's administration and commander-in-chief of the Royal Thai Army.
Surawit Khonsomboon, Prime Minister's Office, Minister of Thailand, and Deputy Minister of Public Health.
Nattawut Saikua, Deputy Minister of Commerce of Thailand and Deputy Minister of Agriculture and Cooperatives of Thailand.
Thaworn Senniam, Deputy Minister of Interior of Thailand.
Karoon Sai-ngam, Senator, Buriram Province.
Apirak Kosayodhin, Governor, Bangkok Metropolitan Administration.

Notable faculty members
 Thanong Bidaya, Former professor of finance and dean from NIDA Business School who became Deputy Prime Minister and Minister of Finance under Chavalit Yongchaiyudh's administration and Thaksin Shinawatra's administration.
 Wolfgang Drechsler, Tallinn University of Technology and Harvard University, visiting professor
 Werner Jann, Potsdam University, former chief of the planning staff of Schleswig-Holstein, visiting professor
 Somkid Jatusripitak, Former professor of marketing from NIDA Business School who became Deputy Prime Minister and Minister of Commerce in Thaksin Shinawatra's administration.

References

External links
 NIDA website

Business schools in Thailand
Universities and colleges in Bangkok
Educational institutions established in 1966
1966 establishments in Thailand
Institutes of higher education in Thailand